The 1927 All-Pacific Coast football team consists of American football players chosen by various organizations for All-Pacific Coast teams for the 1927 college football season. The organizations selecting teams in 1934 included the Associated Press (AP) and the United Press (UP).

All-Pacific Coast selections

Quarterback
 Morley Drury, USC (AP-1; UP-1)

Halfbacks
 Richard Hyland, Stanford (AP-1; UP-1)
 Chuck Carroll, Washington (AP-1; UP-1)

Fullback
 Biff Hoffman, Stanford (AP-1; UP-1)

Ends
 Irvine Phillips, California (AP-1; UP-1)
 Leroy Schuh, Washington (AP-1)
 John Preston, Stanford (UP-1)

Tackles
 Fritz Coltrin, California (AP-1; UP-1)
 Jesse Hibbs, USC (AP-1; UP-1)

Guards
 William Wright, Washington (AP-1; UP-1)
 Seraphim Post, Stanford (AP-1)
 Vernon Eilers, Oregon Aggies (UP-1)

Centers
 Larry Bettencourt, St. Mary's (AP-1) (College Football Hall of Fame)
 John H. "Hal" McCreery, Stanford (UP-1)

Key

AP = Associated Press

UP = United Press

Bold = Consensus first-team selection by the AP and UP

See also
1927 College Football All-America Team

References

All-Pacific Coast Football Team
All-Pacific Coast football teams
All-Pac-12 Conference football teams